The individual championship test, grade Ia, para-equestrian dressage event at the 2016 Summer Paralympics was contested on the afternoon of 15 September 2016 at the Olympic Equestrian Centre in Rio de Janeiro.

The competition was assessed by a ground jury composed of five judges placed at locations designated E, H, C, M, and B. Each judge rated the competitors' performances with a percentage score. The five scores from the jury were then averaged to determine a rider's total percentage score.

Sophie Christiansen of Great Britain defended her title, holding off 2008 Champion and compatriot Anne Dunham. This was Christensen's 4th medal in the event, having also won a silver behind Dunham in 2008, and a bronze in 2004.

Results 

 WD : withdrawn

References 

 

Individual championship test grade 1a